Lewis Herbert Martell (26 March 1885 – 24 August 1962) was a Liberal party member of the House of Commons of Canada. He was born in Main-à-Dieu, Nova Scotia and became a lawyer.

The son of John Thomas Martell and Rachel A. Lewis, he was educated at the Sydney Academy, King's College and Dalhousie Law School. Martell practised law in Windsor, Nova Scotia. In 1916, he married Ethel Mary Macdonald.

He was first elected to Parliament at the Hants riding in the 1921 general election after an unsuccessful campaign there in the 1917 election as a Laurier Liberal. After completing his only term, the 14th Canadian Parliament, Martell left federal politics and did not seek re-election in the 1925 vote. He died of a stroke in Halifax on 24 August 1962.

Electoral record

References

External links
 

1885 births
Schulich School of Law alumni
Lawyers in Nova Scotia
Liberal Party of Canada MPs
Members of the House of Commons of Canada from Nova Scotia
University of King's College alumni
1953 deaths